Goleta or La Goleta may refer to:

 Goleta (spider), a spider genus
 Goleta, California, United States, a suburban city in Santa Barbara County
 La Goleta, the Spanish and Portuguese name for La Goulette, a municipality and the port of Tunis, Tunisia

See also